Borgwallsee is a lake in Mecklenburg-Vorpommern, Germany, at an elevation of . Apart from the woods on the southern shore, the area surrounding the lake is used widely for agriculture.

Borgwallsee is a drinking water reservoir serving the city of Stralsund. As such, water activities are restricted and bathing is allowed only in designated areas.

References

External links 
 
 

Lakes of Mecklenburg-Western Pomerania